Susch railway station is a railway station in the municipality of Zernez, in the Swiss canton of Graubünden. It is located at the junction of the  Bever–Scuol-Tarasp and Vereina lines of the Rhaetian Railway. Hourly services operate on this line.

Services
The following services stop at Susch:

References

External links
 
 

Railway stations in Graubünden
Rhaetian Railway stations
Railway stations in Switzerland opened in 1913